Henry Hardy (born 1949) is a British author and editor.

Henry Hardy may also refer to:

 Henry Hardy (architect) (1830–1908), Scottish architect
 Harry Hardy (Henry Hardy, 1895–1969), footballer
 Andrew (Society of the Divine Compassion) (1869–1946), British Anglican priest and friar, birth name Henry Ernest Hardy

See also
 Harry Hardy (baseball) (1875–1943), baseball player
 Henry Hardie (disambiguation)